Ban Ma station is a railway station located in Ban Ko Subdistrict, Ayutthaya City, Phra Nakhon Si Ayutthaya.

Train services 
 Ordinary No. 202 Phitsanulok- Bangkok
 Ordinary No. 207 Bangkok- Nakhon Sawan
 Ordinary No. 209/210 Bangkok- Ban Takhli- Bangkok
 Commuter No. 301/302 Bangkok- Lop Buri- Bangkok (weekends only)
 Commuter No. 303 Bangkok- Lop Buri (weekdays only)
 Commuter No. 313/314 Bangkok- Ban Phachi Junction- Bangkok (weekdays only)
 Commuter No. 339 Bangkok- Kaeng Khoi Junction (weekdays only)
 Commuter No. 341/342 Bangkok- Kaeng Khoi Junction- Bangkok (weekdays only)
 Commuter No. 343/344 Bangkok- Kaeng Khoi Junction- Bangkok (weekends only)
 Local No. 409 Ayutthaya- Lop Buri

References 
 
 

Railway stations in Thailand